Khidib is a rural locality (a selo) and the administrative center of Khidibsky Selsoviet, Tlyaratinsky District, Republic of Dagestan, Russia. The population was 45 as of 2010.

Geography 
Khidib is located 18 km north of Tlyarata (the district's administrative centre) by road. Tlobzoda is the nearest rural locality.

References 

Rural localities in Tlyaratinsky District